Dimitar Dushkov Penev (born 12 July 1945) is a Bulgarian football coach and former player and central defender of CSKA Sofia. He played 90 games for Bulgaria national football team and scored two goals. He is regarded as one of his country's best ever defenders, winning Bulgarian footballer of the year in 1967 and 1971, he also participated in three world cups for his country in 1966, 1970 and 1974. He is Honorary President of CSKA Sofia and semi-pro side Nottingham United FC.

Personal life
Penev is uncle of former Bulgarian international and national team coach Lyuboslav Penev.

Coaching career
Penev was manager of the Bulgaria national team during the 1994 FIFA World Cup, where his team reached the semi-finals and then lost the bronze medal game with Sweden. Throughout his career as manager he demonstrated excellence in both tactics and team psychology. Penev's most notable quality was his ability to work well with young players. During his career at CSKA Sofia he discovered a lot of previously unknown or little-known talented youths and used them as a basis for a domestically and internationally successful squad. Amongst them Hristo Stoichkov, Emil Kostadinov, Lyuboslav Penev, Martin Petrov, Stiliyan Petrov and Dimitar Berbatov.

On 30 July 2007, he was appointed manager of the Bulgaria national team for the second time. Last he was the manager of CSKA Sofia, but on 6 March 2009 CSKA fired the coach – the Bulgarian team decided to sub him with his nephew Lyuboslav Penev, former player of CSKA Sofia, Celta Vigo, Valencia CF and Atlético Madrid.

Relevant statistics
As of April 2007, Penev has been in charge of the Bulgaria national team for 55 matches in total (25 wins, 15 draws, 15 losses, with a goal difference of 88:60).

Honours

Player
Lokomotiv Sofia
 A Group: 1963–64

CSKA Sofia
 A Group (7): 1965–66, 1968–69, 1970–71, 1971–72, 1972–73, 1974–75, 1975–76
 Bulgarian Cup: 1965, 1969, 1972, 1973, 1974

Manager
Bulgaria
FIFA World Cup: fourth place 1994

References

1945 births
Living people
Footballers from Sofia
Bulgarian footballers
Bulgaria international footballers
Bulgarian football managers
FC Lokomotiv 1929 Sofia players
PFC CSKA Sofia players
First Professional Football League (Bulgaria) players
1966 FIFA World Cup players
1970 FIFA World Cup players
1974 FIFA World Cup players
1994 FIFA World Cup managers
UEFA Euro 1996 managers
PFC CSKA Sofia managers
Bulgaria national football team managers
PFC Spartak Varna managers
People from Sofia City Province
Association football defenders